"I Won't Mention It Again" is a 1971 single written by Cameron "Cam" Mullins and Carolyn Jean Yates, and recorded by Ray Price. "I Won't Mention it Again" was Ray Price's sixth number one on the country chart. The single stayed at number one for three weeks and spent a total of seventeen weeks on the country chart.  "I Won't Mention it Again also charted on the US Hot 100, and Easy Listening charts.

Chart performance

References

Ray Price (musician) songs
1971 singles
1970 songs
Song recordings produced by Don Law